The Edmund Dwight House is a historic house at 5 Cambridge Street in Winchester, Massachusetts, straddling the town line with Arlington.  It was built in 1858 in an Italianate style.  It was one of the first and grandest country houses built in Winchester at a time when Boston businessmen were seeking to build such houses.  Edmund Dwight, the wealthy businessman who was its first owner, was married to a great-granddaughter of Thomas Jefferson.  The house's design is believed to be based loosely on that of Jefferson's Monticello.  The house is sited for an expansive view of the Upper Mystic Lake. This residence was also home to Claude Shannon, the father of Information theory, and his wife Betty Shannon. While living there, they installed a chair lift that took the rider from the home down to the lake.

The house is a -story wood-frame structure, originally finished in clapboard siding.  It is basically rectangular, with a rounded central bay on the eastern facade, facing the lake.  A single-story porch wraps around three sides of the building.  Significant alterations were made to the house in the 1890s, including the stuccoing of the exterior, and the addition of a two-story ell to the northeast corner.  These changes were made under the auspices of local architect Robert Coit.  A second, single-story, addition was made to the northwest corner in 1985.  The original  property purchased by the Dwights was subdivided  1940, leaving the house on just .  The house's stable was then converted to a residence, and stands on an adjacent lot in Arlington.

The house was added to the National Register of Historic Places in 1989.

See also
National Register of Historic Places listings in Winchester, Massachusetts
National Register of Historic Places listings in Arlington, Massachusetts

References

Houses on the National Register of Historic Places in Winchester, Massachusetts
Houses in Winchester, Massachusetts
Houses in Arlington, Massachusetts